Shadwell is a Docklands Light Railway (DLR) station in Shadwell in east London, England and is between the terminals of Bank and Tower Gateway to the west and Limehouse to the east. The 1991 Bank extension joins the main DLR line just to the west of Shadwell. It is located near Shadwell railway station for London Overground services, in Travelcard Zone 2.

History
This station opened on 31 August 1987 as part of the first tranche of DLR stations. It is located 50 yards to the west of an earlier station that was first called Shadwell and then renamed Shadwell & St. George's East, serving the slow lines of the London, Tilbury & Southend Railway that this section of the DLR replaced.

Initially designed for one-car DLR trains, Shadwell's platform was extended for two-car operation in 1991. The station was refurbished in 2009: the platforms were extended to accommodate three-car trains, the station entrance at ground level was altered, and an emergency exit was added at the east end of the platforms.

Location
The station stands on a viaduct and consists of a single island platform serving trains in both directions. The ticket machines and entrance are at ground level to the west of the island platforms, facing onto Watney Street. The station is usually unstaffed, like most stations on the DLR. There is a crossover west of the station which allows trains from Westferry, Bank or Tower Gateway to reverse here.

Connections
London Buses routes 100, 339 and D3 serve the station.

Services
The typical off-peak service from the station is:

Westbound
15 tph (trains per hour) to Bank
6 tph to Tower Gateway

Eastbound
6 tph to Woolwich Arsenal
6 tph to Beckton
9 tph to Lewisham

References

External links

 Docklands Light Railway website – Shadwell station page

Docklands Light Railway stations in the London Borough of Tower Hamlets
Railway stations in Great Britain opened in 1987